Hockey Saskatchewan is the governing body of all ice hockey in Saskatchewan. Hockey Saskatchewan is a branch of Hockey Canada. Hockey Saskatchewan was established as the Saskatchewan Amateur Hockey Association in 1906, and was later known as the Saskatchewan Hockey Association.

History
The Saskatchewan Amateur Hockey Association (SAHA) was established in 1906 to govern ice hockey in the province of Saskatchewan. Its senior ice hockey teams began competing for the Allan Cup in 1909. The SAHA became a charter member of the Canadian Amateur Hockey Association when the national body was established in 1914. Junior ice hockey teams from Saskatchewan began competing for the Memorial Cup in 1919.

The SAHA later shortened its name to the Saskatchewan Hockey Association (SHA). The SHA rebranded itself as Hockey Saskatchewan in 2021, to bring itself inline with the naming convention used by Hockey Canada, and to avoid confusion with the Saskatchewan Health Authority which also used SHA as an acronym.

Leagues
Highway Hockey League (Senior)
Qu’Appelle Valley Hockey League (Senior)

Saskatchewan Junior Hockey League (Junior "A")
Prairie Junior Hockey League (Junior "B")
Qu'Appelle Valley Hockey League (Junior "C")

Saskatchewan Midget AAA Hockey League (Minor)
Saskatchewan Female Midget AAA Hockey League (Minor)

Former leagues
Saskatchewan Junior Hockey League (1948–1966) (Junior "A")
Western Canada Junior Hockey League (1948–1956) (Junior "A")

Notable people
 Frederick E. Betts, SAHA president 1919–1920
 Dave Dryburgh, SAHA secretary 1930s–1940s
 Jack Hamilton, SAHA president 1925–1927
 Al Pickard, SAHA president 1941–1943
 Gordon Juckes, SAHA president 1953–1955

See also
List of ice hockey teams in Saskatchewan

References

External links
Hockey Saskatchewan

 
Ice hockey in Saskatchewan
Ice hockey governing bodies in Canada
Ice
1912 establishments in Saskatchewan
Sports organizations established in 1912